Ronald Henry Donnelly (September 1937 – 4 February 2021), known as Har Donnelly, was an Irish Gaelic football player.

Career

Born in Kilcormac, County Offaly of a Dublin-born father and an Offaly-born mother, Donnelly and his family moved to Athlone at an early age. Here he received an education and a Gaelic football tuition in the Marist College. With the college Donnelly played in various Leinster competitions and in County Westmeath juvenile and minor championships he lined out with the Athlone club. Shortly after he joined the Air Corps in 1955 he lined out with Dublin's "Offaly Exiles", who invited him to play in a number of challenge matches which brought him to the attention of the Offaly selectors. After making his competitive debut in the 1958 Leinster Championship, Donnelly made a combined total of 50 league-championship appearances in a six-year career. During that time he claimed back-to-back Leinster Championships and played at left corner-forward when Offaly made their maiden appearance in an All-Ireland final in 1961.

Donnelly died on 4 February 2021, aged 83.

Honours

Offaly
Leinster Senior Football Championship: 1960, 1961

Leinster
Railway Cup; 1962

References

1937 births
2021 deaths
Athlone Gaelic footballers
Offaly inter-county Gaelic footballers
Leinster inter-provincial Gaelic footballers